Red Alert: The War Within is an Indian crime drama film directed by Ananth Narayan Mahadevan. It was released theatrically in India on 9 July 2010. The drama is based on the true story of Narasimha who gets caught up in a clash between police and Naxalites and is then forced to work with the latter.

Red Alert premiered at the 6th Stuttgart Film Festival in 2009.

Cast
Source for first 12 cast-members: Characters per additional sources.
Sunil Shetty ...     Narasimha
Sameera Reddy ... Laxmi 
Ayesha Dharker... Radhaka
Seema Biswas... Saralaka
Bhagyashree... Uma
Ashish Vidyarthi ... Velu
Makrand Deshpande... V.K. Raghavan
Sunil Sinha ...
Ehsan Khan... Krishna
Gulshan Grover ... Deputy Inspector General Rathod
Naseeruddin Shah... Naga(Cameo)
Vinod Khanna... Krishnaraj
Ashraful Haque... Naxalite
Vikas Shrivastav... Naxalite

Release
The Hindi-language film was dubbed into Telugu, Chhattisgarhi and English versions, with all four versions scheduled to be released the same day. Rahul Aggarwal, one of the producers, said all the actors dubbed their English lines themselves.

The film was originally scheduled to be completed and released in 2008.

Response
The film was not reviewed by a sufficient number of contributing critics to be rated at the review aggregating site Rotten Tomatoes. Rachel Saltz of The New York Times said the film "seems torn between two storytelling modes: episodic with a documentary flavor and action-driven pulp. It makes a hash of both." She added, "For some reason [it] has been dubbed into heavily accented English for American release, adding an unnecessary 'What did he say?' level of difficulty." Frank Lovece of Film Journal International echoed that, saying, the film "plays like one of those stiff historical drams that educational-film companies make for schools. Or in this case, an outsourced educational-film company." Adam Keleman  of Slant believed, "The unforgivable flaw of the film is its lack of subtlety, the way character detail and plot development is laid for us on a silver platter, never requiring the audience to ... fully engage with the intricacies of the lead character's internal and moral quandary."

Accolades
 Winner, Director's Vision Award at the 2009 Stuttgart Film Festival
 Winner, South Asian International Film Festival Award for Best Actor - Sunil Shetty 
 Winner, Stardust Search Light Award for Best Actor - Sunil Shetty

References

External links
Red Alert: The War Within (official site)

Tuteja, Joginder. "'Red Alert could have been set in Cuba or Ireland' - Anant Mahadevan", BollywoodHungama.com, 7 July 2010
Kashifrazaseed. "Red Alert, eye opener on Naxalism, lesson for all", AllVoices.com, 30 June 2010

2009 films
2000s Hindi-language films
Films about Naxalism
Films directed by Anant Mahadevan